Damond is a given name and surname. Notable people with the name include:

Damond Jiniya (born 1974), American singer and lyricist
Damond Powell (born 1992), American football player
Damond Smith (born 1991), American football player
Damond Williams (born 1980), American basketball player
Justine Damond (1977–2017), Australian American fatally shot by police